Dan Thomas Edwards is a retired diocesan bishop of the Episcopal Diocese of Nevada.

Biography
Edwards grew up in Texas and practiced law in Colorado and Idaho. He served as regional director of a Migrant Law program and later became statewide director of a Native American Law program. Prior to his election on October 12, 2007, Edwards served as rector of St Francis' Church in Macon, Georgia and dean of the region's convocation of congregations. He was consecrated bishop on January 5, 2008, by is predecessor and now Presiding Bishop Katharine Jefferts Schori.

See also
 List of Episcopal bishops of the United States
 Historical list of the Episcopal bishops of the United States

External links 
Nevada diocese elects Georgia priest Dan Edwards as bishop

Episcopalians from Nevada
American Episcopal priests
Living people
American religious leaders
Year of birth missing (living people)
Place of birth missing (living people)
Episcopal bishops of Nevada